Audace colpo dei soliti ignoti (also known as Fiasco in Milan or Hold-up à la milanaise) is a 1959 Italian comedy crime film directed by Nanni Loy. The film stars Vittorio Gassman, Renato Salvatori and Claudia Cardinale.

It is the sequel to Mario Monicelli's I soliti ignoti (1958) and is followed by Big Deal After 20 Years (1985).

Plot
A Milanese gangster contacts Peppe (Gassman); he has identified him and his accomplices as the perpetrators of the bungled attempt at robbing the Madonna Street pawn shop.

His offer is to reunite the same men for a daring robbery in Milan, where the local offices of football betting pool Totocalcio shift the weekly revenue on Sunday afternoon via a common car with just an accountant and a driver in it. The gang would have to travel north from Rome disguised among the supporters of A. S. Roma going to Milan for a football match, commit the robbery and then flee to Bologna via a souped-up car there to rejoin the returning sport fans.

The Milanese seems tough and smart and his proposal sounds very inviting for the small-time crooks who all have their problems trying to lead an "honest" life, but things will go differently.

Cast

Release
Audace colpo dei soliti ignoti opened in Rome in December 1959. It was shown in Paris in August 1962 with the title Hold-up la milanaise.

References

External links
 

1959 films
1950s crime comedy films
1950s heist films
1950s Italian-language films
French heist films
Italian heist films
French black-and-white films
Italian black-and-white films
Italian crime comedy films
French crime comedy films
Commedia all'italiana
Titanus films
Films directed by Nanni Loy
Films scored by Piero Umiliani
Films set in Rome
Films set in Milan
Italian sequel films
Films with screenplays by Age & Scarpelli
1959 comedy films
1960s Italian films
1950s Italian films
1950s French films
1960s French films